Asralt Khairkhan (lit. "solicitous  holy mountain") is a mountain in Erdene, Töv Province in central Mongolia. The edge of the mountain is home to a small settlement that hosts the only known monastery of local minority religion Pi Shashin.

References

External links 
 Asralt Khairkhan Tour

Mountains of Mongolia
Töv Province
Two-thousanders of Mongolia